Protecting Our Children is a British documentary television series about social workers in the child protection department in Bristol. Lesley Sharp narrates the series, which was shown on BBC Two from 30 January – 13 February 2012.

Episode list

External links

2012 British television series debuts
2012 British television series endings
BBC television documentaries
Television shows set in Bristol
English-language television shows